The 2016/17 FIS Freestyle Ski World Cup was the thirty eighth World Cup season in freestyle skiing organised by International Ski Federation. The season started on 3 September 2016 and ended on 26 March 2017. This season included six disciplines: moguls, aerials, ski cross, halfpipe, slopestyle and big air.

Map of world cup hosts 
All 33 locations hosting world cup events both for men and ladies.

Men

Ski Cross

Moguls

Aerials

Big Air

Slopestyle

Halfpipe

Women

Ski Cross

Moguls

Aerials

Big Air

Slopestyle

Halfpipe

Team

Men's standings

Overall 

Standings after 46 races.

Ski Cross 

Standings after 14 races.

Moguls 

Standings after 11 races.

Aerials 

Standings after 7 events.

Big Air 

Standings after 6 races.

Slopestyle 

Standings after 4 races.

Halfpipe 

Standings after 4 races.

Cross Alps Tour 

Standings after 6 races.

FIS Super Series 

Standings after 3 races.

Women's standings

Overall 

Standings after 46 races.

Ski Cross 

Standings after 13 races.

Moguls 

Standings after 11 races.

Aerials 

Standings after 7 events.

Big Air 

Standings after 6 races.

Slopestyle 

Standings after 5 races.

Halfpipe 

Standings after 4 races.

Cross Alps Tour 

Standings after 6 races.

FIS Super Series 

Standings after 3 races.

Nations Cup

Overall 

Standings after 92 events.

Men's overall 

Standings after 46 events.

Ladies' overall 

Standings after 46 events.

Ski Cross  

Standings after 27 events.

Moguls 

Standings after 22 events.

Aerials 

Standings after 14 events.

Big Air 

Standings after 12 events.

Slopestyle 

Standings after 9 events.

Halfpipe 

Standings after 8 events.

Cross Alps Tour Overall 

Standings after 12 events.

Men's Cross Alps Tour 

Standings after 6 events.

Ladies' Cross Alps Tour 

Standings after 6 events.

Footnotes

References 

FIS Freestyle Skiing World Cup
World Cup
World Cup
Freestyle